Several Canadian naval units have been named HMCS Halifax.

  (I) was a  that served in the Second World War.
  (II) is the lead ship for the s.

Battle Honours
Atlantic, 1942–45
Arabian Sea

See also

References

 Directorate of History and Heritage - HMCS Halifax 

Royal Canadian Navy ship names